Bairoi (Olatpur) is a town situated 17 km from Phul Nakhara and 30 km from Cuttack and Bhubaneswar in Orissa, India. It is the birthplace of Ramakrushna Nanda, the grandfather of Manoranjan Nanda, a writer and social worker.

Demographics 
Bairoi has a population of 50,000 including males and females. Bairoi has an average literacy rate of 85%.

Cuttack district